Nobiin, also known as Halfawi, Mahas, or Dongulawi, is a Northern Nubian language of the Nilo-Saharan language family.

At least 2500 years ago, the first Nubian speakers migrated into the Nile valley from the southwest. Old Nubian is thought to be ancestral to Nobiin. Nobiin is a tonal language with contrastive vowel and consonant length. The basic word order is subject–object–verb.

Nobiin is currently spoken along the banks of the Nile in Upper Egypt and northern Sudan by approximately 610,000 Nubians. Present-day Nobiin speakers are almost universally multilingual in local varieties of Arabic, generally speaking Modern Standard Arabic (for official purposes) as well as Saʽidi Arabic or Sudanese Arabic. Many Nobiin-speaking Nubians were forced to relocate in 1963–1964 to make room for the construction of the Aswan Dam at Aswan, Egypt and for the upstream Lake Nasser.

There is no standardised orthography for Nobiin. It has been written in both Latin and Arabic scripts; also, recently there have been efforts to revive the Old Nubian alphabet. This article adopts the Latin orthography used in the only published grammar of Nobiin, Roland Werner's (1987) Grammatik des Nobiin.

Geography and demography

Before the construction of the Aswan Dam, speakers of Nobiin lived in the Nile valley between the third cataract in the south and Korosko in the north. About 60% of the territory of Nubia was destroyed or rendered unfit for habitation as a result of the construction of the dam and the creation of Lake Nasser. At least half of the Nubian population was forcibly resettled.  Nowadays, Nobiin speakers live in the following areas: (1) near Kom Ombo, Egypt, about 40 km north of Aswan, where new housing was provided by the Egyptian government for approximately 50,000 Nubians; (2) in the New Halfa Scheme in the Kassala, Sudan, where housing and work was provided by the Sudanese government for Nubians from the inundated areas around Wadi Halfa; (3) in the Northern state, Sudan, northwards from Burgeg to the Egyptian border at Wadi Halfa. Additionally, many Nubians have moved to large cities like Cairo and Khartoum. In recent years, some of the resettled Nubians have returned to their traditional territories around Abu Simbel and Wadi Halfa.

Practically all speakers of Nobiin are bilingual in Egyptian Arabic or Sudanese Arabic. For the men, this was noted as early as 1819 by the traveller Johann Ludwig Burckhardt in his Travels to Nubia. The forced resettlement in the second half of the twentieth century also brought more Nubians, especially women and children, into daily contact with Arabic. Chief factors in this development include increased mobility (and hence easy access to non-Nubian villages and cities), changes in social patterns such as women going more often to the market to sell their own products, and easy access to Arabic newspapers. In urban areas, many Nubian women go to school and are fluent in Arabic; they usually address their children in Arabic, reserving Nobiin for their husband. In response to concerns about a possible language shift to Arabic, Werner notes a very positive language attitude. Rouchdy (1992a) however notes that use of Nobiin is confined mainly to the domestic circle, as Arabic is the dominant language in trade, education, and public life. Sociolinguistically, the situation may be described as one of stable bilingualism: the dominant language (Arabic in this case), although used widely, does not easily replace the minority language since the latter is tightly connected to the Nubian identity.

Nobiin has been called Mahas(i), Mahas-Fiadidja, and Fiadicca in the past. Mahas and Fiadidja are geographical terms which correspond to two dialectal variants of Nobiin; the differences between these two dialects are negligible, and some have argued that there is no evidence of a dialectal distinction at all. Nobiin should not be confused with the Nubi language, an Arabic-based creole.

History
Nobiin is one of the few languages of Africa to have a written history that can be followed over the course of more than a millennium. Old Nubian, preserved in a sizable collection of mainly early Christian manuscripts and documented in detail by Gerald M. Browne (1944–2004), is considered ancestral to Nobiin. Many manuscripts, including Nubian Biblical texts, have been unearthed in the Nile Valley, mainly between the first and fifth cataracts, testifying to a firm Nubian presence in the area during the first millennium. A dialect cluster related to Nobiin, Dongolawi, is found in the same area. The Nile-Nubian languages were the languages of the Christian Nubian kingdoms of Nobatia, Makuria and Alodia.

The other Nubian languages are found hundreds of kilometers to the southwest, in Darfur and in the Nuba Mountains of Kordofan. For a long time it was assumed that the Nubian peoples dispersed from the Nile Valley to the south, probably at the time of the downfall of the Christian kingdoms. However, comparative lexicostatistic research in the second half of the twentieth century has shown that the spread must have been in the opposite direction. Joseph Greenberg (as cited in Thelwall 1982) calculated that a split between Hill Nubian and the two Nile-Nubian languages occurred at least 2500 years ago. This is corroborated by the fact that the oral tradition of the Shaigiya tribe of the Jaali group of arabized Nile Nubians tells of coming from the southwest long ago. The speakers of Nobiin are thought to have come to the area before the speakers of the related Kenzi-Dongolawi languages (see classification below).

Since the seventh century, Nobiin has been challenged by Arabic. The economic and cultural influence of Egypt over the region was considerable, and, over the centuries, Egyptian Arabic spread south. Areas like al-Maris became almost fully Arabized. The conversion of Nubia to Islam after the fall of the Christian kingdoms further enhanced the Arabization process. In what is today Sudan, Sudanese Arabic became the main vernacular of the Funj Sultanate, with Nobiin becoming a minority tongue. In Egypt, the Nobiin speakers were also part of a largely Arabic-speaking state, but Egyptian control over the south was limited. With the Ottoman conquest of the region in the sixteenth century, official support for Arabization largely ended, as the Turkish and Circassian governments in Cairo sometimes saw Nobiin speakers as a useful ally. However, as Arabic remained a language of high importance in Sudan and especially Egypt, Nobiin continued to be under pressure, and its use became largely confined to Nubian homes.

Classification
Nobiin is one of the about eleven Nubian languages. It has traditionally been grouped with the Dongolawi cluster, mainly based on the geographic proximity of the two (before the construction of the Aswan Dam, varieties of Dongolawi were spoken north and south of the Nobiin area, in Kunuz and Dongola respectively). The uniformity of this 'Nile-Nubian' branch was first called into doubt by Thelwall (1982) who argued, based on lexicostatistical evidence, that Nobiin must have split off from the other Nubian languages earlier than Dongolawi. In Thelwall's classification, Nobiin forms a "Northern" branch on its own whereas Dongolawi is considered part of Central Nubian, along with Birged (North Darfur) and the Hill Nubian languages (Nuba Mountains, Kordofan).

In recent times, research by Marianne Bechhaus-Gerst has shed more light on the relations between Nobiin and Dongolawi. The groups have been separated so long that they do not share a common identity; additionally, they differ in their traditions about their origins. The languages are clearly genetically related, but the picture is complicated by the fact that there are also indications of contact-induced language change (Bechhaus-Gerst 1996). Nobiin appears to have had a strong influence on Dongolawi, as evidenced by similarities between the phoneme inventories as well as the occurrence of numerous borrowed grammatical morphemes. This has led some to suggest that Dongolawi in fact is "a 'hybrid' language between old Nobiin and pre-contact Dongolawi" (Heine & Kuteva 2001:400). Evidence of the reverse influence is much rarer, although there are some late loans in Nobiin which are thought to come from Dongolawi (Bechhaus-Gerst 1996:306).

The Nubian languages are part of the Eastern Sudanic branch of the Nilo-Saharan languages. On the basis of a comparison with seventeen other Eastern Sudanic languages, Thelwall (1982) considers Nubian to be most closely related to Tama, a member of the Taman group, with an average lexical similarity of just 22.2 per cent.

Phonology
Nobiin has open and closed syllables:  'mouth',  'woman',  'uncle',  'camel',  'blood'. Every syllable bears a tone. Long consonants are only found in intervocalic position, whereas long vowels can occur in initial, medial and final position. Phonotactically, there might be a weak relationship between the occurrence of consonant and vowel length: forms like  'climb' and  'be present' are found, but *dàrìl (short V + short C) and *dààrrìl (long V + long C) do not exist; similarly,  'grow' and  'lose (a battle)' occur, but not *féyìr and *fééyyìr.

Vowels
Nobiin has a five vowel system. Vowels can be long or short, e.g. 'fear' (long ),  'fish-hook' (short ). However, many nouns are unstable with regard to vowel length; thus,  :  'feast',  :  'fire',  :  'spear'.

Consonants
Consonant length is contrastive in Nobiin, e.g.  'path' vs.  'kitchen'. Like vowel length, consonant length is not very stable; long consonants tend to be shortened in many cases (e.g. the Arabic loan  'shop' is often found as ).

The phoneme  has a somewhat marginal status as it only occurs as a result of certain morphophonological processes. Originally,  only occurred as an allophone of  before voiced consonants; however, through the influx of loanwords from Arabic it has acquired phonemic status:  'pain'. This process is unidirectional (i.e.  will never change into one of the above consonants) and it has been termed 'consonant switching' by Werner (1987:36). Only in very few words, if any, does  have independent phonemical status: Werner lists  'voice' and  'braying', but it might be noted that the latter example is less convincing because of its probably onomatopoeic nature. The approximant  is a voiced labial-velar.

Tone
Nobiin is a tonal language, in which tone is used to mark lexical contrasts. Tone also figures heavily in morphological derivation. Nobiin has two underlying tones, high and low. A falling tone occurs in certain contexts; this tone can in general be analysed as arising from a high and a low tone together.

 'settlement' (high)
 'shadow' (low)

In Nobiin, every utterance ends in a low tone. This is one of the clearest signs of the occurrence of a boundary tone, realized as a low tone on the last syllable of any prepausal word. The examples below show how the surface tone of the high tone verb  ‘cook’ depends on the position of the verb. In the first sentence, the verb is not final (because the question marker  is appended) and thus it is realized as high. In the second sentence, the verb is at the end of the utterance, resulting in a low tone on the last syllable.

   (vegetables:DO cook:she.PRESENT-Q)   'Does she cook the vegetables?'
   (yes vegetables:DO cook:she.PRESENT)   'Yes, she cooks the vegetables.'

Tone plays an important role in several derivational processes. The most common situation involves the loss of the original tone pattern of the derivational base and the subsequent assignment of low tone, along with the affixation of a morpheme or word bringing its own tonal pattern (see below for examples).

For a long time, the Nile Nubian languages were thought to be non-tonal; early analyses employed terms like "stress" or "accent" to describe the phenomena now recognized as a tone system. Carl Meinhof reported that only remnants of a tone system could be found in the Nubian languages. He based this conclusion not only on his own data, but also on the observation that Old Nubian had been written without tonal marking. Based on accounts like Meinhof's, Nobiin was considered a toneless language for the first half of the twentieth century. The statements of de facto authorities like Meinhof, Diedrich Hermann Westermann, and Ida C. Ward heavily affected the next three decades of linguistic theorizing about stress and tone in Nobiin. As late as 1968, Herman Bell was the first scholar to develop an account of tone in Nobiin. Although his analysis was still hampered by the occasional confusion of accent and tone, he is credited by Roland Werner as being the first to recognize that Nobiin is a genuinely tonal language, and the first to lay down some elementary tonal rules.

Grammar

Pronouns
The basic personal pronouns of Nobiin are:

There are three sets of possessive pronouns. One of them is transparently derived from the set of personal pronouns plus a connexive suffix . Another set is less clearly related to the simple personal pronouns; all possessive pronouns of this set bear a high tone. The third set is derived from the second set by appending the nominalizing suffix .

Nobiin has two demonstrative pronouns:  'this', denoting things nearby, and  'that', denoting things farther away. The demonstrative pronoun always precedes the nouns it refers to.

   (this man hen one-OB have:3.sgPRESENT)   'This man has a hen.'
   (that girl who be.Q)   'Who is that girl?'

Nouns
Nouns in Nobiin are predominantly disyllabic, although monosyllabic and three- or four-syllabic nouns are also found. Nouns can be derived from adjectives, verbs, or other nouns by appending various suffixes. In plural formation, the tone of a noun becomes low and one of four plural markers is suffixed. Two of these are low in tone, while the other two have a high tone.

  (L):  →  '(sweet) dates'
  (L):  →  'falls'
  (H):  →  'men, people'
  (H):  →  'chairs'

In most cases it is not predictable which plural suffix a noun will take. Furthermore, many nouns can take different suffixes, e.g.  'mouth' → /. However, nouns that have final  usually take Plural 2, whereas disyllabic low-high nouns typically take Plural 1.

Gender is expressed lexically, occasionally by use of a suffix, but more often with a different noun altogether, or, in the case of animals, by use of a separate nominal element  'masculine' or  'feminine':

 'man' vs.  'woman'
 'boy' vs.  'girl'
 'she-ass' vs.  'donkey'

The pair male slave/female slave forms an interesting exception, showing gender marking through different endings of the lexeme:  'slave (m)' vs.  'slave (f)'.

In compound nouns composed of two nouns, the tone of the first noun becomes low while the appended noun keeps its own tonal pattern.

  'cat' +  'wild' →  'wild cat'
  'guest' +  'house' →  'guest room'
  'sling' +  'stone' →  'sling stone'

Many compounds are found in two forms, one more lexicalized than the other. Thus, it is common to find both the coordinated noun phrase  'the water of the river' and the compound noun  'river-water', distinguished by their tonal pattern.

Verbs
Verbal morphology in Nobiin is subject to numerous morphophonological processes, including syllable contraction, vowel elision, and assimilation of all sorts and directions. A distinction needs to be made between the verbal base and the morphemes that follow. The majority of verbal bases in Nobiin end in a consonant (e.g.  'sleep',  'eat',  'follow',  'lie'); notable exceptions are  'go' and  'drink'. Verbal bases are mono- or disyllabic. The verbal base carries one of three or four tonal patterns. The main verb carries person, number, tense, and aspect information.

    (I morning.prayer pray:I.PRESENT)   'I pray the morning prayer.'

Only rarely do verbal bases occur without appended morphemes. One such case is the use of the verb  'go' in a serial verb-like construction.

    (meat one:OB FUTURE go buy:IPRESENT)   'I'm going to buy a piece of meat.'

Syntax
The basic word order in a Nobiin sentence is subject–object–verb. Objects are marked by an object suffix , often assimilating to the final consonant of the word (e.g.  'book',  'book-OBJECT' as seen below). In a sentence containing both an indirect and a direct object, the object marker is suffixed to both.

    (camel corn-OB eat:he.PRESENT)   'The camel eats corn.'
    (I you-OB this book-OB give:I.PRESENT)   'I give you this book.'

Questions can be constructed in various ways in Nobiin. Constituent questions ('Type 1', questions about 'who?', 'what?', etc.) are formed by use of a set of verbal suffixes in conjunction with question words. Simple interrogative utterances ('Type 2') are formed by use of another set of verbal suffixes.

Some of the suffixes are similar. Possible ambiguities are resolved by the context. Some examples:

   (what water in live:PRES.2/3SG.Q1)   'What lives in water?'
   (where Nile run/flow:PRES.2/3SG.Q1)   'Where does the Nile flow?'
   (you soap:OB have:2/3SG.PRES.Q2)   'Do you have soap?'
   (soap:OB have:PRES2/3SG.Q2)   'do you sell soap?' / 'Does he/she sell soap?'
   (you (pl.) party.at dance:PRES1/2PL.Q2)   'Do you (pl.) dance at the party?'

Writing system
Old Nubian, considered ancestral to Nobiin, was written in a Coptic-like script, an uncial variety of the Greek alphabet, extended with three Coptic letters —  "sh" ,  "h" , and  "j"  — and three unique to Nubian: ⳡ "ny"  and ⳣ "w" , apparently derived from the Meroitic alphabet; and ⳟ "ng" , thought to be a ligature of two Greek gammas.

There are three currently active proposals for the script of Nobiin (Asmaa 2004, Hashim 2004): the Arabic script, the Latin script and the Old Nubian alphabet. Since the 1950s, Latin has been used by 4 authors, Arabic by 2, and Old Nubian by 1, in the publication of various books of proverbs, dictionaries, and textbooks. For Arabic, the extended Islamic Educational, Scientific and Cultural Organization system may be used to indicate vowels and consonants not found in Arabic itself.

More recent educational material implements the teaching and using of the Nubian alphabet.

Notes and references

Notes

References

 Abdel-Hafiz, Ahmed S.(2009) A Reference Grammar of Kunuz Nubian. Saarbrücken Germany: VDM Verlag Dr. MÜller, e.k.
 Adams, William Y. (1977) Nubia, Corridor to Africa. London: Allen Lane.
 Adams, William Y. (1982) "The coming of Nubian speakers to the Nile Valley", in Ehret, C. & Posnansky, M. (eds.) The Archeological and Linguistic Reconstruction of African History. Berkeley/Los Angeles, 11–38.
 Asmaa M. I. Ahmed, "Suggestions for Writing Modern Nubian Languages", and Muhammad J. A. Hashim, "Competing Orthographies for Writing Nobiin Nubian", in Occasional Papers in the Study of Sudanese Languages No. 9, SIL/Sudan, Entebbe 2004.
 Bechhaus-Gerst, Marianne (1996) Sprachwandel durch Sprachkontakt am Beispiel des Nubischen im Niltal. Möglichkeiten und Grenzen einer diachronen Soziolinguistik. Köln: Rüdiger Köppe.
 Bell, Herman (1974) "Dialect in Nobíin Nubian". In Abd el-Gadir Mohmoud Abdalla (ed.) Studies in Ancient Languages of the Sudan. Khartoum. 109–122.
 Bell, Herman (2000) 'A survey of Nubian Place-Names', Working Paper, No. 19, United Nations Group of Experts on Geographical Names. (online version)
 Browne, Gerald M. (2002) A grammar of Old Nubian.  Munich: LINCOM. .
 Burckhardt, Johann Ludwig (or John Lewis) (1819) Travels in Nubia. London. (online version)
 Heine, Bernd & Tania Kuteva (2001) 'Converge and divergence in the development of African languages',  chapter 14 of Aikhenvald & Dixon (eds.) Areal Diffusion and Genetic Inheritance: Problems in Comparative Linguistics, 393–411.
 Lepsius, R. (1880) Nubische Grammatik. Mit einer Einleitung über die Völker und Sprachen Afrikas. Berlin.
 Rouchdy, Aleya (1992a) '"Persistence" or "tip" in Egyptian Nubian', in Nancy Dorian (ed.) Investigating Obsolescence: Studies in Language Contraction and Death. Cambridge: Cambridge University Press, 91–102.
 Rouchdy, Aleya (1992b) 'Urban and non-urban Egyptian Nubian: is there a reduction in language skill?', in Nancy Dorian (ed.) Investigating Obsolescence: Studies in Language Contraction and Death. Cambridge: Cambridge University Press, 259–266.
 Thelwall, Robin (1978) "Lexicostatistical relations between Nubian, Daju and Dinka", Études nubiennes: colloque de Chantilly, 2-6 juillet 1975, 265–286.
 Thelwall, Robin (1982) "Linguistic Aspects of Greater Nubian History", in Ehret, C. & Posnansky, M. (eds.) The Archeological and Linguistic Reconstruction of African History. Berkeley/Los Angeles, 39–56. (online version with OCR errors)
 Werner, Roland (1987) Grammatik des Nobiin (Nilnubisch) (Nilo-Saharan Studies vol. 1). Hamburg: Helmut Buske Verlag. 
 Westermann, Diedrich Hermann & Ward, Ida (1933) Practical Phonetics for Students of African Languages. London [etc.]: Oxford University Press for the International African Institute.

External links
 Nobiin audio samples and alphabet
 Nobiin basic lexicon at the Global Lexicostatistical Database
 New website with Nobiin texts and audio samples: www.nobiin.com
ELAR Archive deposit of Nobíin, a Nubian language by Kirsty Rowan & Herman Bell

Nubian languages
+
Nubia
Languages of Sudan
Languages of Egypt